The European qualifying competition for the 2019 FIFA Women's World Cup was a women's football competition that determined the eight UEFA teams joining the automatically qualified hosts France in the final tournament.

Apart from France, 46 of the remaining 54 UEFA member national teams entered the qualifying competition, with Andorra making their World Cup qualification debut and Kosovo making their competitive debut.

Format
The qualifying competition consisted of three rounds:
Preliminary round: The 16 lowest-ranked teams were drawn into four groups of four teams. Each group was played in single round-robin format at one of the teams which were pre-selected as hosts. The four group winners and the best runners-up (not counting results against the fourth-placed team) advance to the qualifying group stage.
Qualifying group stage: The 35 teams (30 highest-ranked teams and five preliminary round qualifiers) were drawn into seven groups of five teams. Each group was played in home-and-away round-robin format. The seven group winners qualify directly for the final tournament, while the four best runners-up (not counting results against the fifth-placed team) advance to the play-offs.
Play-offs: The four teams play two knockout rounds of home-and-away two-legged matches to determine the last qualified team from UEFA.

Tiebreakers
In the preliminary round and qualifying group stage, teams were ranked according to points (3 points for a win, 1 point for a draw, 0 points for a loss), and if tied on points, the following tiebreaking criteria were applied, in the order given, to determine the rankings (Regulations Articles 13.01, 13.02, and 15.01):
Points in head-to-head matches among tied teams;
Goal difference in head-to-head matches among tied teams;
Goals scored in head-to-head matches among tied teams;
(Qualifying group stage only) Away goals scored in head-to-head matches among tied teams;
If more than two teams were tied, and after applying all head-to-head criteria above, a subset of teams was still tied, all head-to-head criteria above were reapplied exclusively to this subset of teams;
Goal difference in all group matches;
Goals scored in all group matches;
(Qualifying group stage only) Away goals scored in all group matches;
(Preliminary round only) Penalty shoot-out if only two teams have the same number of points, and they met in the last round of the group and were tied after applying all criteria above (not used if more than two teams have the same number of points, or if their rankings were not relevant for qualification for the next stage);
Disciplinary points (red card = 3 points, yellow card = 1 point, expulsion for two yellow cards in one match = 3 points);
UEFA coefficient for the preliminary round or qualifying group stage draw.

To determine the best runner-up from the preliminary round and the four best runners-up from the qualifying group stage, the results against the teams in last place (fourth place in preliminary round and fifth place in qualifying group stage) were discarded. The following criteria were applied (Regulations Articles 13.03 and 15.02):
Points;
Goal difference;
Goals scored;
(Qualifying group stage only) Away goals scored;
Disciplinary points;
UEFA coefficient for the preliminary round or qualifying group stage draw.

In the play-offs, the team that scored more goals on aggregate over the two legs qualified for the final tournament. If the aggregate score was level, the away goals rule was applied, i.e., the team that scored more goals away from home over the two legs advances. If away goals were also equal, extra time was played. The away goals rule was again applied after extra time, i.e., if there were goals scored during extra time and the aggregate score was still level, the visiting team advances by virtue of more away goals scored. If no goals were scored during extra time, the tie was decided by penalty shoot-out (Regulations Article 17.01).

Schedule
The qualifying matches were played on dates that fell within the FIFA Women's International Match Calendar.

Entrants
The teams were ranked according to their coefficient ranking, calculated based on the following:
UEFA Women's Euro 2013 final tournament and qualifying competition (20%)
2015 FIFA Women's World Cup final tournament and qualifying competition (40%)
UEFA Women's Euro 2017 qualifying competition (40%)

The 30 highest-ranked teams entered the qualifying group stage, while the 16 lowest-ranked teams entered the preliminary round. The coefficient ranking was also used for seeding in the preliminary round and qualifying group stage draws.

Notes
Teams marked in bold qualified for the World Cup.

Preliminary round

Draw
The draw for the preliminary round was held on 19 January 2017, 13:30 CET (UTC+1), at the UEFA headquarters in Nyon, Switzerland.

The 16 teams were allocated into four seeding positions according to their coefficient ranking. They were drawn into four groups of four containing one team from each of the four seeding positions. First, the four teams which were pre-selected as hosts were drawn from their own designated pot and allocated to their respective group as per their seeding positions. Next, the remaining 12 teams were drawn from their respective pot which were allocated according to their seeding positions.

Notes
Teams which were pre-selected as preliminary round hosts were denoted by (H).
Teams marked in bold advanced from preliminary round to qualifying group stage.

Groups

Group 1

Group 2

Group 3

Group 4

Ranking of second-placed teams
To determine the best second-placed teams from the preliminary round which advance to the qualifying group stage, only the results of the second-placed teams against the first and third-placed teams in their group were taken into account, while results against the fourth-placed team were not included. As a result, two matches played by each second-placed team were counted for the purposes of determining the ranking.

Qualifying group stage

Draw
The draw for the qualifying group stage was held on 25 April 2017, 13:30 CEST (UTC+2), at the UEFA headquarters in Nyon, Switzerland.

The 35 teams were allocated into five seeding pots according to their coefficient ranking, with the five preliminary round qualifiers placed in Pot E. They were drawn into seven groups of five containing one team from each of the five seeding pots. For political reasons, Russia and Ukraine would not be drawn in the same group.

Notes
Teams marked in bold qualified for the final tournament as group winners.
Teams marked in italics advanced to the play-offs as four best runners-up.
Teams which advanced from preliminary round to qualifying group stage were denoted by (P).

Groups

Group 1

Group 2

Group 3

Group 4

Group 5

Group 6

Group 7

Ranking of second-placed teams
To determine the four best second-placed teams from the qualifying group stage which advanced to the play-offs, only the results of the second-placed teams against the first, third and fourth-placed teams in their group were taken into account, while results against the fifth-placed team were not included. As a result, six matches played by each second-placed team were counted for the purposes of determining the ranking.

Play-offs

Draw

Matches

Play-off semi-finals

Play-off final

Qualified teams
The following nine teams from UEFA qualified for the final tournament, including France which qualified as hosts.

1 Bold indicates champions for that year. Italic indicates hosts for that year.

Top goalscorers

For full lists of goalscorers, see sections in each group:

Preliminary round
Group 1
Group 2
Group 3
Group 4
Group 5
Group 6
Group 7
Play-offs

References

External links
FIFA Women's World Cup, UEFA.com

 
2019 FIFA Women's World Cup qualification
2019
2017 in women's association football
2018 in women's association football
Women's World Cup qualification
Women's World Cup qualification
Women's World Cup qualification
April 2017 sports events in Europe
September 2017 sports events in Europe
October 2017 sports events in Europe
November 2017 sports events in Europe
January 2018 sports events in Europe
April 2018 sports events in Europe
June 2018 sports events in Europe
August 2018 sports events in Europe
September 2018 sports events in Europe
October 2018 sports events in Europe
November 2018 sports events in Europe